Zarechny is a rural locality (a settlement) in Pankrushikhinsky Selsoviet, Pankrushikhinsky District, Altai Krai, Russia. The population was 107 as of 2013. There is 1 street.

Geography 
Zarechny is located 8 km southeast of Pankrushikha (the district's administrative centre) by road. Pankrushikha is the nearest rural locality.

References 

Rural localities in Pankrushikhinsky District